The Escorts (later The Do's & Don'ts) are a 1950s and 1960s Rock and roll band from Iowa, United States. The Iowa Rock 'N Roll Music Association's Hall of Fame inducted this band in the year that the Hall of Fame was started, 1997. They were one of the first bands in Iowa to play Rock and Roll music, starting in 1959. They released more 45 rpm records than any other Iowa band in the 1960s. They performed in ballrooms all over Iowa and traveled out-of-state as well. They are one of the few bands to perform for over 45 years. See related article The Escorts / The Do's & The Don'ts (album).

Members of The Escorts included Dennis Shryack, who later became a successful screenwriter on such films as Code of Silence (1985), Pale Rider (1985) and Turner & Hooch (1989).

Suggested reading
Iowa Rocked! The 1960s (2nd edition) By Tom Tourville
(Midwest Publications, 56 pages saddlestitched; 1996)

References

External links
The Escorts / Do's & Don'ts
The Do's and Don'ts on Facebook
The Iowa Rock 'N Roll Music Association
Fan videos

Escorts